Frenchtown, Maryland may refer to:
 Frenchtown, Baltimore, the historic French quarter of Baltimore
 Frenchtown (ghost town), Maryland, on the Elk River in Cecil County
 Frenchtown (unincorporated community), Maryland, north of Perryville in Cecil County
 Frenchtown-Rumbly, Maryland, in Somerset County